Gonbar Rural District is in the Central District of Osku County, East Azerbaijan province, Iran. At the National Census of 2006, its population was 7,315 in 1,554 households. There were 7,704 inhabitants in 2,012 households at the following census of 2011. At the most recent census of 2016, the population of the rural district was 7,763 in 2,255 households. The largest of its 11 villages was Gonbar, with 3,460 people.

References 

Osku County

Rural Districts of East Azerbaijan Province

Populated places in East Azerbaijan Province

Populated places in Osku County